Cyrus Edwin Dallin (November 22, 1861 – November 14, 1944) was an American sculptor best known for his depictions of Native Americans. He created more than 260 works, including the Equestrian Statue of Paul Revere in Boston; the Angel Moroni atop Salt Lake Temple in Salt Lake City; and Appeal to the Great Spirit (1908), at the Museum of Fine Arts, Boston. He was also an accomplished painter and an Olympic archer.

Biography

Dallin was born in Springville, Utah Territory, the son of Thomas and Jane (Hamer) Dallin, both of whom had left the Church of Jesus Christ of Latter-day Saints (LDS Church) before their marriage. At age 19, he moved to Boston to study sculpture with Truman Howe Bartlett. He studied in Paris, with Henri Chapu and at the Académie Julian.

In 1883, he entered a competition to sculpt an equestrian statue of Paul Revere for Boston, Massachusetts. He won the competition and received a contract, but six versions of his model were rejected. The fifth model was not accepted because of fundraising problems. The seventh version was accepted in 1939 and the full-size statue was unveiled in 1940.

Dallin converted to Unitarianism and initially turned down the offer to sculpt the angel Moroni for the spire of the LDS Church's Salt Lake Temple. He later accepted the commission and, after finishing the statue said, "My angel Moroni brought me nearer to God than anything I ever did." His statue became a symbol for the LDS Church and was the model for other angel Moroni statues on the spires of LDS Church temples.

In Boston, Dallin became a colleague of Augustus St. Gaudens and a close friend of John Singer Sargent. He married Vittoria Colonna Murray in 1891 and returned to Utah to work on The Angel Moroni (1893). He taught for a year at the Drexel Institute in Philadelphia, Pennsylvania, while completing his Sir Isaac Newton (1895) for the Library of Congress. In 1897, he traveled to Paris, and studied with Jean Dampt. He entered a Don Quixote statuette in the Salon of 1897, and The Medicine Man in the Salon of 1899 and the Exposition Universelle (1900). The couple moved to Arlington, Massachusetts, in 1900, where they established their residence and raised three sons.

At the 1904 Summer Olympics in St. Louis, Missouri, Dallin competed in archery, winning the bronze medal in the team competition. He finished ninth in the Double American round and 12th in the Double York round.

From 1899 to 1941, he was a member of the faculty of Massachusetts Normal Art School (now the Massachusetts College of Art and Design) where his more notable students included Bashka Paeff, Vincent Schofield Wickham and Ruth Johnston Surez. In 1912, he was elected to the National Academy of Design as an Associate member and became a full Academician in 1930. He also was a member of the National Sculpture Society and the National Association of Arts and Letters, as well as an associate at the at the National Academy of Design. 

When he died in 1944, his life was celebrated in a Unitarian service and he is buried in Mount Pleasant Cemetery in Arlington, Massachusetts .

Equestrian sculptures of indigenous peoples 
Dallin created four prominent equestrian sculptures of indigenous people: A Signal of Peace, or The Welcome (1890); The Medicine Man, or The Warning (1899); Protest of the Sioux, or The Defiance (1904); and Appeal to the Great Spirit (1908).

A Signal of Peace was exhibited at the 1893 World's Columbian Exposition and was installed in Chicago's Lincoln Park in 1894. The Medicine Man was exhibited at the 1899 Paris Salon, and the 1900 Exposition Universelle in Paris, where it won a gold medal. It was installed in Philadelphia's Fairmount Park in 1903.

The full-size staff version of Protest of the Sioux was exhibited at the 1904 Louisiana Purchase Exposition, where it won a gold medal. The mounted brave defiantly shaking his fist at an enemy was never cast as a full-size bronze and survives only in statuette form. A one-third-size bronze version, cast in 1986, is at the Springville Museum of Art in Springville, Utah.

Appeal to the Great Spirit became an icon of American art and is Dallin's most famous work. The full-size version was cast in bronze in Paris and won a gold medal at the 1909 Paris Salon. It was installed outside the main entrance to the Boston Museum of Fine Arts in 1912. Smaller versions of the work are in numerous American museums and in the permanent collection of the White House.

In 1929, a full-sized bronze version of Appeal to the Great Spirit—personally overseen and approved by Dallin— was installed in Muncie, Indiana, at the intersection of Walnut and Granville Streets, and is considered by many residents to be a symbol of their city. A one-third-size plaster version was given to Tulsa, Oklahoma's Central High in 1923. It stood in the school's main hall until 1976, when Central closed its doors. In 1985, that plaster was used to cast a one-third-size bronze version, which is now in Woodward Park (Tulsa), at the intersection of 21st and Peoria Streets. There is also a version at St. John University in Wisconsin.

Legacy

More than 60 of his works are collected in the Cyrus E. Dallin Museum, located in the Jefferson Cutter House in Arlington, Massachusetts. Many other of his sculptures are in the vicinity.

An elementary school in Arlington is named for him.

The Taylor-Dallin House in Arlington where Dallin and his family lived is a privately owned residence and has not been listed on the National Register of Historic Places.

More than 30 of Dallin's works are on display at the Springville Museum of Art in his birthplace of Springville, Utah. The Dallin House at 253 S. 300 East Street in Springville is listed on the National Register of Historic Places.

Dallin's papers are at the Smithsonian Archives of American Art.

The Beach Boys based the logo for their Brother Records label on Dallin's sculpture, Appeal to the Great Spirit. 

From 2017-2020 a race horse named Cyrus Dallin raced in the United Kingdom.

Selected works 

Model for Equestrian Statue of Lafayette (1889), Smithsonian American Art Museum, Washington, D.C.
The Angel Moroni (1893), atop Salt Lake Temple, Salt Lake City, Utah
Brigham Young Monument (1893), Main and South Temple Streets, Salt Lake City, Utah
Sunol (1893), Harness Racing Museum & Hall of Fame, Goshen, New York
Sir Isaac Newton (1895), Main Reading Room, Library of Congress, Washington, D.C.
Don Quixote de La Mancha: The Knight of the Windmill (1898), Springville Museum of Art, Springville, Utah
Equestrian statue of Paul Revere (1899, dedicated 1940), Paul Revere Mall, opposite Old North Church, Boston, Massachusetts
View of Hobble Creek (ca 1900), Utah Museum of Fine Arts, Salt Lake City, Utah
Eli Whitney Tablet (1902), Richmond County Courthouse, Augusta, Georgia
The Pickett (1905), Battle of Hanover, Hanover, Pennsylvania
Victory (1909), Pioneer Park, Provo, Utah
General Winfield Scott Hancock (1909–10), Pennsylvania State Memorial, Gettysburg Battlefield, Gettysburg, Pennsylvania

Soldiers' and Sailors' Monument (1909–1911), Clinton Square, Syracuse, New York
My Boys (c. 1910), Robbins Memorial Library, Arlington, Massachusetts
Robbins Memorial Flagstaff (1914), Town Hall, Arlington
Anne Hutchinson (1915, dedicated 1922), Massachusetts Statehouse, Boston
Alma Mater (Missouri Sculpture) (1916), Mary Institute of Washington University, Ladue, Missouri
Chief Justice William Cushing Memorial Tablet (1919) Scituate Historical Society, Scituate, Massachusetts
Governor William Bradford (1920, dedicated 1976), Pilgrim Hall Museum, Plymouth, Massachusetts
Pilgrim Tercentenary half dollar (1920)
Signing the Mayflower Compact (1921), Provincetown, Massachusetts
Boy and His Dog (1923) Lincoln, Massachusetts
Memory (1924), Sherborn War Memorial, Sherborn, Massachusetts
Spirit of Life (1929). Springville Museum of Art, Springville, Utah
Pioneer Women of Utah (1931), Springville Museum of Art, Springville, Utah
Memorial to The Pioneer Mothers of Springville (1932), Springville City Park, Springville, Utah

Indigenous American works
A Signal of Peace (1890), Lincoln Park, Chicago, Illinois
The Medicine Man (1899), Fairmount Park, Philadelphia, Pennsylvania
Protest of the Sioux (1904)
A one-third-size bronze version (cast 1986) is in the Springville Museum of Art in Springville, Utah
Appeal to the Great Spirit (1909), Boston Museum of Fine Arts, Boston, Massachusetts
Smaller bronze versions are in Muncie, Indiana and the Museum of the West in Scottsdale, Arizona
A one-third-size plaster version, and a 1985 bronze version (cast from that plaster) are in Tulsa, Oklahoma
The Scout (1910, dedicated 1922), Penn Valley Park, Kansas City, Missouri
A one-third-size bronze version is in Seville, Spain; a 1992 gift from Seville's sister-city, Kansas City, Missouri
Chief Joseph (1911), New York Historical Society, New York City
Menotomy Indian Hunter (1911), Robbins Memorial Gardens, Arlington, Massachusetts
Massasoit (1920), Cole's Hill, opposite Plymouth Rock, Plymouth, Massachusetts
Other casts are at Utah State Capitol, Salt Lake City, Utah; Brigham Young University, Provo, Utah; Springville Museum of Art, Springville, Utah; Mill Creek Park, Kansas City, Missouri; and Dayton Art Institute, Dayton, Ohio.
On the Warpath #28 (c. 1920), Utah Museum of Fine Arts, Salt Lake City, Utah and Brookgreen Garden Museum, Brookgreen, South Carolina
Passing of the Buffalo, also known as The Last Arrow (1929), Muncie, Indiana
Pretty Eagle, Portrait Bust
Robbins Memorial Flagstaff, (1914) Native American woman with infant, Town Hall, Arlington.
Sacagawea (1914), Museum of the West in Scottsdale, Arizona. A plaster version is in the Cyrus Dallin Art Museum, Arlington.

Gallery

References

External links

 
 
List of sculptures by Cyrus Dallin in Massachusetts
 The Cyrus E. Dallin Art Museum, Arlington, Massachusetts
 Springville Museum of Art , Springville, Utah

 from 1943 Class of Central High

 
1861 births
1944 deaths
Sculptors from Utah
People from Springville, Utah
Sculptors from Massachusetts
Artists from Boston
People from Arlington, Massachusetts
Académie Julian alumni
Drexel University faculty
Massachusetts College of Art and Design faculty
Angel Moroni
American male archers
Olympic bronze medalists for the United States in archery
Archers at the 1904 Summer Olympics
National Academy of Design members
Former Latter Day Saints
American Unitarians
Converts to Unitarianism
American male sculptors
Medalists at the 1904 Summer Olympics
National Sculpture Society members
American currency designers
Coin designers
19th-century American sculptors
19th-century male artists
20th-century American sculptors
20th-century artists
20th-century male artists